Laura a la ciutat dels sants is a 1931 novel written by the Catalan writer Miquel Llor. The work is rooted in realism and modernisme, but it also has features of the 1930s, more influenced by Freud and other modern authors. Set in Vic, it follows the initial journey of Laura and her development as a person. The negative image of rural and catholic caused a controversy that made Llor write the second part, El somriure dels sants (1947), which clarified this pessimistic portrait.

References 

1931 in Catalonia
1931 novels
Spanish bildungsromans
Catalan-language novels